"Everytime You Go Away" is a song written and composed by Daryl Hall. It was first recorded in 1980 by the American duo Hall & Oates but was not released as a single. A cover version of the song by Paul Young became an international hit in 1985, reaching No. 1 in the US and No. 4 in the UK.

Hall and Oates version
The original version of "Everytime You Go Away" appeared on Hall & Oates's 1980 studio album, Voices, although it was not released as a single. Hall & Oates also recorded it for their 1985 concert album Live at the Apollo.

Personnel 
 Daryl Hall – lead vocals, backing vocals, synthesizers 
 John Oates – backing vocals, 6-string and 12-string guitars
 G.E. Smith – guitars
 Ralph Schuckett – organ
 John Siegler – bass
 Jerry Marotta – drums
 Charlie DeChant – saxophone

Paul Young version

Background
English singer Paul Young recorded a cover version of the song titled "Every Time You Go Away" for his studio album The Secret of Association in 1985. His cover features a combination of echoed piano, the Yamaha DX7's "harp" preset, the distinctive fretless bass of Pino Palladino, as well as a Coral electric sitar, and Ovation Spanish acoustic guitar which were both played by John Turnbull.

In March 1985, Young's version hit No. 4 in the UK Singles Chart. It was among the songs he performed at Live Aid held at Wembley Stadium in London on 13 July 1985. It reached number one on the Billboard Hot 100 two weeks later, and was one of two top 10 hits Young had on the U.S. pop singles chart (the second being his 1990 cover of "Oh Girl" by the Chi-Lites). "Every Time You Go Away" also topped the U.S. adult contemporary chart for two weeks. The song won British Video of the Year at the 1986 Brit Awards.

Personnel 
 Paul Young – lead vocals, backing vocals
 Ian Kewley – acoustic piano, synthesizers
 John Turnbull – electric sitar, classical guitar
 Steve Bolton - electric guitar
 Pino Palladino – fretless bass
 Mark Pinder – drums
 Marc Chantereau – tambourine
 Jimmy Chambers – backing vocals
 George Chandler – backing vocals
 Tony Jackson – backing vocals

Music video

Track listings
 7" single
 "Everytime You Go Away" – 4:15
 "This Means Anything" – 3:13

 12" maxi
 "Everytiime You Go Away" (extended version) – 7:32
 "This Means Anything" – 3:13

 15" album
 "Everytime You Go Away" – 4:28

Chart performance

Weekly charts

Year-end charts

Certifications

All-time charts

Kulcha version

In July 1995, Australian R&B group Kulcha released a version of the song, which peaked at 35 in Australia and 22 in New Zealand.

CD single
 "Everytime You Go Away" - 4:02	
 "Everytime You Go Away" (instrumental) - 3:58	
 "My Love" - 3:36

Charts

Cover versions
Gloria Gaynor on her 1986 album The Power of Gloria Gaynor
Blue Room on the soundtrack to the 1987 film Planes, Trains and Automobiles.
George Benson and Al Jarreau on their 2006 album Givin' It Up.
Susan Wong on her 2009 album 511.
Barbara Jones on her 2010 album Blue Side Of Lonesome
Lennon Stella and Kevin Garrett on a 2020 single.
Jamaican-Canadian singer George Banton on his album Rock and Soul Vol. 1.

See also
List of Hot 100 number-one singles of 1985 (U.S.)
List of number-one adult contemporary singles of 1985 (U.S.)

References

External links
Every Time You Go Away music video on YouTube

1980 songs
1985 singles
1995 singles
Hall & Oates songs
Paul Young songs
Kulcha (band) songs
Columbia Records singles
East West Records singles
Billboard Hot 100 number-one singles
Cashbox number-one singles
Songs written by Daryl Hall
RPM Top Singles number-one singles
Pop ballads